Heart Yngrid is a Filipino romance author for Precious Hearts Romances known for her novel series Drop-dead Playboys and St. Catherine University. Two of her novels titled Love Is Only In The Movies and Love Me Again have been made as TV series on ABS-CBN's Precious Hearts Romances Presents.

References

External links
Official website

1985 births
Living people
Filipino writers
Filipino women writers
Filipino romantic fiction writers
Women romantic fiction writers